Centre for Excellence in Basic Sciences (or UM-DAE CEBS) is an autonomous institute with an affiliation to the University of Mumbai. It was set up in the University of Mumbai by the Department of Atomic Energy (DAE) in collaboration with the university . This institute offers undergraduate science education and research opportunities. It aims at improving the quality of basic science education in the country at the undergraduate level and developing a pool of scientists for the various scientific works of the country. The Institute was inaugurated on 17 September 2007 by Dr R. Chidambaram, Principal Scientific Advisor to the Government of India. In 2016, the institution was granted the status of "Aided Institution" under the Department of Atomic Energy by the Government of India.

Dr. Vimal Kumar Jain took over as the Director of UM-DAE Centre for Excellence in Basic Sciences on 18 October 2017 (AN). The founding director of the institute was Prof. Deepak Mathur, Distinguished Professor and former Dean of Tata Institute of Fundamental Research, Mumbai. 
The second Director of the institute was Prof. Ramakrishna V. Hosur who was also a Senior Professor (Chemical Sciences) at the Tata Institute of Fundamental Research and was, in 2014, awarded Padmashree by the Government of India.

Organisation 

This autonomous institute is managed by a governing council headed by the Secretary of Dept. of Atomic Energy, Govt. of India which is the supreme decision making body for the institute. The Governing Council consists of scientists, academicians, and professors from proximate institutions.

Matters related to academic activities are handled by the Academic Board chaired by Professor J. P. Mittal who is a renowned scientist. Before Prof. Mittal, Prof Raghunathan,  was the chairperson of the CEBS Academic Board. The complete list of members of the Governing Council and Academic Board can be seen at http://cbs.ac.in/administration/academic-board

Campus 

CBS functions from the Kalina Campus of the University of Mumbai, Santacruz(E), Mumbai. Prefabricated buildings near Annabhau Sathe Bhavan in the University campus serve as classrooms, library, computer lab, and chemistry and biology undergraduate labs. Some laboratories have moved to the new faculty block near the Nano Sciences Building of the University of Mumbai.

Currently, CEBS students are housed in the Annabhau Sathe Bhavan and in the new hostel building which is located a little distance away from the present building. In addition to the facilities provided by the institute, the University of Mumbai also extends its own facilities to the students which include a library (Jawaharlal Nehru University Library) and sports facilities. The new CEBS campus -  Administrative and faculty building) is under construction.  The new hostel block is already occupied by its students.

Admissions 

The students studying in undergraduate courses are selected through the National Entrance Screening Test (NEST), also used by National Institute of Science Education and Research, Bhubaneswar.

Selected students are called for counseling and admission to CBS. All subjects are compulsory in the first year.  Specialisation of stream starts from the second year, i.e. Sem III. Students are required to pay fees and other charges in full amount on the date of admission.

The graduate students are selected by interview subject to certain criteria in the master's degree.

Academic Office 

The Academic board of the institute exists to facilitate, initiate and co-ordinate the academic work of the Institute, particularly the teaching and assessment of students. It acts as the repository of grades and academic records of all students, both past and present.

Departments and research activities 

The institute at present has 4 departments which are:

 Physics 
 Mathematics
 Chemical Sciences
 Life Sciences

Various research works are being carried out at CEBS in close association with institutes like TIFR, BARC, Institute of Chemical Technology (UDCT) in nuclear physics, astrophysics,  free electron lasers, biophysics, genetics, chemical biology, cell and developmental biology, and cancer biology and therapeutics.

Student Life and Culture 

Students of UM-DAE CEBS, known as CBScients, reside at Anna Bhau Sathe Bhawan, the newly built pre-fabricated housing structures in the Mumbai University campus and in the New Hostel Block. Library, common room, maintenance, and mess facilities are provided by the institute. In addition, students can use the sports facilities provided by CEBS as well as the University.

Summer Associate Research Programme (SARP)
CEBS offers a 2-months of internship opportunity to students who are 2nd year or above pursuing their B.Sc. or Integrated M.Sc. in the fields of chemistry (organic, inorganic and physical), biology, mathematics, and physics-astronomy, condensed matter, quantum mechanics, etc.

See also 
 List of universities in India
 List of autonomous higher education institutes in India

References 

2007 establishments in Maharashtra
Educational institutions established in 2007
Research institutes in Mumbai
Universities and colleges in Mumbai
University of Mumbai